Eny Erlangga (born 2 April 1981) is a former Indonesian badminton player. She was the gold medalist at the 1999 Asian Junior Championships in the mixed doubles event partnered with Hendri Kurniawan Saputra, also clinched the silver medal in the girls' team event. She was part of the Indonesia women's team that won the gold medal at the 2001 Southeast Asian Games. She won a Grand Prix title at the 2001 Thailand Open in the women's doubles event with Jo Novita.

Achievements

Asian Championships 
Women's doubles

Southeast Asian Games 
Women's doubles

Asian Junior Championships 
Mixed doubles

IBF World Grand Prix 
The World Badminton Grand Prix has been sanctioned by the International Badminton Federation from 1983 to 2006.

Women's doubles

References

External links 
 

Living people
1981 births
Indonesian female badminton players
Competitors at the 2001 Southeast Asian Games
Competitors at the 2003 Southeast Asian Games
Southeast Asian Games gold medalists for Indonesia
Southeast Asian Games silver medalists for Indonesia
Southeast Asian Games bronze medalists for Indonesia
Southeast Asian Games medalists in badminton
21st-century Indonesian women
20th-century Indonesian women